Mohamed Rabie Yassin (born 7 September 1960) is a former Egyptian footballer and current football manager.

As a left back, he played and captained Al Ahly SC as well as playing and captaining the Egypt national team. He participated in the 1990 FIFA World Cup and the 1984 Summer Olympics.

In 2013, as manager of the Egypt national under-20 football team, he won the 2013 African U-20 Championship, and competed in the 2013 FIFA U-20 World Cup.

Managerial statistics

See also
 List of men's footballers with 100 or more international caps

References

1960 births
Living people
Egyptian footballers
Association football defenders
Al Ahly SC players
1990 FIFA World Cup players
Footballers at the 1984 Summer Olympics
Olympic footballers of Egypt
1984 African Cup of Nations players
1986 African Cup of Nations players
1988 African Cup of Nations players
Africa Cup of Nations-winning players
Egyptian Premier League players
FIFA Century Club
Egypt international footballers